Franco Aldo Parisi Fernández (born 25 August 1967) is a Chilean business engineer and economist. He received recognition for doing radio and television programs about economy along with his brother Antonino Parisi, and has been nicknamed "the economist of the people". In 2012 he launched his independent candidacy for president for the 2013 elections in Chile. Parisi ideologically identifies himself as a social liberal. In November 2021 he reached the third place of votes in the first round of the presidential elections, behind José Antonio Kast and Gabriel Boric.

Parisi has not visited Chile in several years, due to having an outstanding warrant for his arrest for not paying child support.

Biography
Parisi was born in Santiago de Chile on 25 August 1967. He studied at the Escuela Experimental Salvador Sanfuentes, and completed his secondary studies at the Instituto Nacional. He also briefly studied at Chile's Military Academy. He graduated with a degree in business administration at the University of Chile, and obtained a doctorate in the same subject at the University of Georgia.

Parisi served as visiting professor at Rice University (2002–03), University of Alabama (2000), University of Georgia (1999), and Georgetown University.  He has held academic positions at Texas Tech University and the University of Alabama, the former which ended after allegations of sexual harassment from university students.  In Chile, he was a professor at the Faculty of Economics and Business of the University of Chile, where he also worked as a vice dean and interim dean in 2010 and was a member of the Group of Monetary Politics (Grupo de Política Monetaria). He ran for dean but lost the election to Manuel Agosín. He also worked at the for-profit Andrés Bello National University, where he was appointed dean of the Business Faculty, and, subsequently became the dean of the Chilean Institute for Executive Development (IEDE), both owned by Laureate International Universities. He resigned the office in July 2012.

In the 1990s, Parisi worked as a junior part-time government advisor in different issues. On 10 June 2010 he was appointed councilor of the Chilean Copper Commission (Cochilco) by president Sebastián Piñera. He left office on 10 June 2012.

During 2011, following a controversy with local retailer La Polar, Parisi made several appearances in Chilean radio and television and his economy phenomena explanations in colloquial terms started to become his trademark. At midyear, Parisi started a TV show called Los Parisi: el poder de la gente (The Parisis: the power of the people), a television program hosted by him and his brother Antonino Parisi. The program was initially broadcast on Vía X, and then in La Red. In March 2012, he advised the leaders of the protests in Aysén.

Presidential candidacy
He announced his presidential pre-candidacy as an independent on 30 January 2012, and called for "independent primaries" against Marco Enríquez-Ominami; however, Enríquez-Ominami declined the proposal. Although some members of the Regionalist Party of the Independents (PRI) wanted the party to support Parisi, the PRI ended up promoting their own candidate, Ricardo Israel. Members of RN requested their directive board "freedom of action" to support Parisi.

In early June 2013, Parisi announced the collection of fifty thousand signatures of people supporting his candidacy, which allowed him to register his candidacy before the Electoral Service of Chile on 7 August 2013.

Personal life
On 16 June 1996,  he married Laura Lee Campbell in Clarke, Georgia, United States; the couple divorced on 5 January 2009.

Works
 
 
  (CD-ROM)
  (CD-ROM)
  (CD-ROM)

References

External links

 Official candidacy website 

1967 births
Living people
Instituto Nacional General José Miguel Carrera alumni
University of Chile alumni
University of Georgia alumni
Rice University faculty
University of Alabama faculty
Georgetown University faculty
Academic staff of the University of Chile
20th-century Chilean economists
People from Santiago
Candidates for President of Chile
Independent politicians in Chile
Chilean television personalities
University of Georgia faculty
Academic staff of the Andrés Bello National University
Chilean people of Italian descent
Party of the People (Chile) politicians
21st-century Chilean economists